MoD Bicester is a large military storage and distribution centre just outside Bicester in Oxfordshire.

History

The site dates back to September 1942 when a depot was constructed near Bicester to provide logistical support for operations in Europe during the Second World War. It is serviced by the Bicester Military Railway. In 1961 the ordnance depots at Didcot and Branston were closed and a Central Ordnance Depot  was created at Bicester. Between 1980 and 1982 the ordnance depots at Chilwell and Ruddington were also closed resulting in an increased role for the remaining central ordnance depots at Bicester and Donnington. The depot became known as the Defence Storage and Distribution Centre in April 1999.

A bomb disposal training base, built at a cost of circa £100 million and including a cave complex, a dive pool and roadways was established at St George's Barracks on the site in March 2013. Then in September 2014, 23 Pioneer Regiment, which had been based at St David's Barracks on the site since the 1940s, was disbanded. 1 Regiment RLC moved from Gütersloh in Germany to St David's Barracks at Bicester in 2016.

Future
The St David's Barracks portion is earmarked for disposal, with a closure date of 2028.

See also
MoD Donnington

References

Installations of the British Army
Barracks in England